"It" the Album is the fourth studio album by English gothic rock band Alien Sex Fiend, released in October 1986 by Anagram Records.

Content 
The album cover was painted by frontman Nik Fiend.

Release 
The 1986 cassette version ("It" the Cassette) also included the band's full 1985 album Maximum Security.

The album was later reissued in CD format with three additional tracks and retitled It (The CD).

Reception 

Trouser Press called the album "unquestionably the group's most creative, mind-expanding undertaking".

Track listing

References

External links 

 

Alien Sex Fiend albums
1986 albums